The Cleopatra Gambit is a 1984 role-playing game adventure for Timemaster published by Pacesetter.

Plot summary
The Cleopatra Gambit is an adventure in which the player characters must stop the shape-shifting Demoreans who have infiltrated ancient Egypt.

Reception
Russell Grant Collins reviewed The Cleopatra Gambit in Space Gamer No. 74. Collins commented that "With work, the GM can make a decent session of play from this module, but if he or she doesn't have the time or inclination to do so, it certainly isn't worth it."

References

Role-playing game supplements introduced in 1984
Science fiction role-playing game adventures
Timemaster